Tuper Tario Tros. is a Flash platform video game first released on Newgrounds on December 24, 2009 by the French developer Swing Swing Submarine. It is a combination of Super Mario Bros. and Tetris, using mechanics from both games. The title of this game is a play on Super Mario Bros., replacing the first letter of each word with the "T" from Tetris. The game features Super Mario level 1-1.

Gameplay
The game starts out with normal Super Mario Bros. 2D platformer gameplay. After a short while, however, the player is granted the ability to control tetrimino blocks across the field of play. The falling blocks, which fall from a Lakitu, can be stacked and become platforms which the player can use to make Mario cross large gaps or reach higher terrain. Pressing the spacebar will change between modes, either controlling Mario or controlling the falling blocks. The screen moves automatically forward to the right, and the player is bound only within the screen.

Reception 

Chris Donlan of Edge wrote that the game appeared to have been put together quickly and as a result, its gameplay was occasionally inelegant. Jenni Lada of TechnologyTell appreciated how she could build a staircase to the flagpole at the end of the level.

References

External links
Original Newgrounds link
Official Site

Tetris
Browser games
Unofficial works based on Mario
Flash games
2009 video games
Free online games
Platform games
Video games developed in France